The Pöhlbach is a river of Saxony, Germany and of the Czech Republic. It is a right tributary of the Zschopau, which it joins near Thermalbad Wiesenbad.

See also
List of rivers of Saxony
List of rivers of the Czech Republic

Rivers of Saxony
Rivers of the Czech Republic
Rivers of the Ore Mountains
Rivers of Germany
Czech Republic–Germany border
International rivers of Europe
Border rivers